Fourteen Days in May is a documentary film directed by Paul Hamann and originally shown on television by the British Broadcasting Corporation (BBC) in 1987. The programme recounts the final days before the execution of Edward Earl Johnson, an American prisoner convicted of rape and murder and imprisoned in the Mississippi State Penitentiary. Johnson protested his innocence and claimed that his confession had been made under duress. He was executed in Mississippi's gas chamber on 20 May 1987.

The documentary crew, given access to the prison warden, guards and chaplain and to Johnson and his family, filmed the last days of Johnson's life in detail. The documentary argues against the death penalty and maintains that capital punishment is disproportionately applied to African-Americans convicted of crimes against whites. The programme features attorney Clive Stafford Smith, an advocate against capital punishment.

Fourteen Days in May won a British Film Institute Grierson Award and a top prize at the Festival dei Populi. It has been shown in many countries but has only appeared in an abbreviated form in the United States, on HBO. Hamann disowned this shortened version.

It was in direct response to this documentary that the Lifelines organisation was set up, to organise pen pals for death row prisoners.

The 1988 track '14 Days in May' by British rapper Overlord X contains samples from this documentary and can be found on the compilation album Street Sounds Hip Hop 20.

See also

Interviews Before Execution
In Prison My Whole Life

References

External links
Allmovie review of Fourteen Days in May at Answers.com
Fourteen Days in May at the British Film Institute
Review of Fourteen Days in May on Chronicles blog
Lifelines website
 

BBC television documentaries
Documentary films about capital punishment in the United States
1987 television specials
1987 films
1980s English-language films
1980s British films